Oleksii, Oleksiy or Oleksiĭ is a Ukrainian male name of Ancient Greek origin.

Some people with the given name Oleksiy 
 Oleksiy Antonov (born 1986), Ukrainian football forward
 Oleksiy Antyukhin (born 1971), retired Ukrainian professional footballer
 Oleksiy Babyr (born 1990), Ukrainian football striker
 Oleksiy Bashakov (born 1988), Ukrainian football midfielder
 Oleksiy Byelik (born 1981), professional Ukrainian football striker
 Oleksiy Cherednyk (born 1960), retired Soviet and Ukrainian football player and a current scout
 Oleksiy Chychykov (born 1987), professional Ukrainian football striker
 Oleksiy Gai (born 1982), Ukrainian footballer
 Oleksiy Hodin (born 1983), Ukrainian midfielder
 Oleksiy Horodov (born 1978), professional Ukrainian football midfielder
 Oleksiy Ivanov (born 1978), Ukrainian football midfielder
 Oleksiy Kartunov, a Doctor of Political Science, professor and a member of the Ukrainian Academy of Political Science
 Oleksiy Kasyanov (born 1985), Ukrainian decathlete
 Oleksiy Kazanin (born 1982), Ukrainian race walker
 Oleksiy Khomin (born 1990), Ukrainian Nordic combined skier
 Oleksiy Khramtsov (born 1975), professional Ukrainian football defender
 Oleksiy Kikireshko (born 1977), rally driver from Ukraine
 Oleksii Kovalov (1989–2022), Ukrainian politician
 Oleksiy Krupskyy (born 1978), Ukrainian jazz guitarist
 Oleksiy Kurylov (born 1988), professional Ukrainian football defender
 Oleksiy Moyseyenko (born 1991), Ukrainian football striker
 Oleksiy Mustafin (born 1971), Ukrainian media-manager, journalist, and politician
 Oleksiy Omel'chenko (born 1989), professional Ukrainian football striker
 Oleksiy Onyschenko (born 1933), the head of the Department of History, Philosophy and Law of the National Academy of Sciences of Ukraine
 Oleksiy Osipov (born 1975), former Ukrainian football player
 Oleksiy Pecherov (born 1985), Ukrainian basketball player
 Oleksiy Polyanskiy (born 1986), Ukrainian footballer
 Oleksiy Pryhorov (born 1987), Ukrainian diver who won an Olympic bronze medal in 2008
 Oleksiy Prytulyak (born 1989), Ukrainian professional footballer
 Oleksiy Rodevych (born 1988), professional Ukrainian football midfielder
 Oleksiy Sereda (born 2005), Ukrainian diver
 Oleksiy Slivinskiy (born 1972), Ukrainian sprint canoeist
 Oleksiy Sokyrskyy (born 1985), Ukrainian hammer thrower
 Oleksiy Tupchiy (born 1986), Ukrainian professional footballer
 Oleksiy Tymchenko (born 1985), Ukrainian football midfielder
 Oleksiy Yakymenko (born 1974), Ukrainian football midfielder

References

Given names of Greek language origin